Jules Antoine Lissajous (4 March 1822 in Versailles – 24 June 1880 in Plombières-les-Dijon) was a French physicist, after whom Lissajous figures are named. Among other innovations, Lissajous invented the Lissajous apparatus, a device that creates the figures that bear his name.  In it, a beam of light is bounced off a mirror attached to a vibrating tuning fork, and then reflected off a second mirror attached to a perpendicularly oriented vibrating tuning fork (usually of a different pitch, creating a specific harmonic interval), onto a wall, resulting in a Lissajous figure. This led to the invention of other apparatus such as the harmonograph.

See also
Lissajous curve
Lissajous orbit

References

External links

1822 births
1880 deaths
19th-century French mathematicians
Lycée Hoche alumni